Dmitri Vladimirovich Yemelyanov (born 9 February 1972) is a Russian professional football coach and a former player.

Honours
 Russian Third League Zone 5 top scorer: 1994 (18 goals).

External links
 

1972 births
Sportspeople from Samara, Russia
Living people
Soviet footballers
Association football midfielders
Russian footballers
Russian Premier League players
PFC Krylia Sovetov Samara players
FC Lada-Tolyatti players
FC KAMAZ Naberezhnye Chelny players
FC Luch Vladivostok players
FC Mordovia Saransk players
Russian football managers
FC Nosta Novotroitsk players